Eleutherodactylus oxyrhyncus is a species of frog in the family Eleutherodactylidae. It is endemic to Hispaniola and known from the Massif de la Hotte and Massif de la Selle, occurring in both the Dominican Republic and Haiti. The common name is rednose robber frog.

E. oxyrhyncus is threatened by habitat loss caused by logging and agriculture. It is known from the Pic Macaya and La Visite National Parks , but habitat degradation is occurring in these areas too.

References

oxyrhyncus
Endemic fauna of Hispaniola
Amphibians of the Dominican Republic
Amphibians of Haiti
Taxa named by André Marie Constant Duméril
Taxa named by Gabriel Bibron
Amphibians described in 1841
Taxonomy articles created by Polbot